The golden shiner (Notemigonus crysoleucas) is a cyprinid fish native to eastern North America. It is the sole member of its genus. Much used as a bait fish, it is probably the most widely pond-cultured fish in the United States. It can be found in Quebec, and its French name is "Mené jaune" or "Chatte de l'Est".

Taxonomy 
It is the only North American member of the Old World clade within subfamily Leuciscinae.

Description
The body is laterally compressed (deep-bodied). The back is dark green or olive, and the belly is a silvery white. The sides are silver in smaller individuals, but golden in larger ones. There can be a faint dusky stripe along the sides. The anal fin is large and has 8-19 rays, while the dorsal fin comprises almost always 8 rays. Scales are relatively large and easily lost when the fish is handled. The mouth is small and upturned. Two characteristics can distinguish the golden shiner from all other minnows: (1) the lateral line has a pronounced downward curve, with its lowest point just above the pelvic fins; and (2) there is a fleshy keel lacking scales on the belly between the pelvic fins and the base of the anal fin. The lack of scales on the keel is important to differentiate the golden shiner from the very similar-looking rudd, Scardinius erythrophtalmus, a European species that has been introduced in a few places in North America. The rudd also has a midventral keel, but that keel bears scales. Golden shiner and rudd can in fact hybridize and hybrids have a few scales on their midventral keel.

Distribution
The golden shiner is found throughout the eastern half of North America, north to the St Lawrence River, Great Lakes, and Lake Winnipeg, and west to the Dakotas and Texas. Because of its use as bait, it has also been introduced in many places outside this native range.

Habitat
Golden shiners prefer quiet waters and are therefore found in lakes, ponds, sloughs, and ditches. They are sometimes found in the quietest parts of rivers. They like weedy areas. They are fairly tolerant of pollution, turbidity, and low oxygen content.

Diet
Golden shiners are omnivorous and crepuscular planktivores. They eat zooplankton, phytoplankton, microcrustaceans, insects, plants, and algae. They can feed at the surface, in mid-water, or at the bottom. They can locate prey visually, or filter-feed on high-density zooplankton without resorting to visual cues. They are themselves food for all manner of game fish such as trout and bass, hence their popularity as bait fish.

Reproduction
In the southern parts of their range, golden shiners can start reproducing at one year of age; in Canada, first breeding is more commonly at three years of age. Females lay up to 200,000 sticky eggs each amid vegetation. There is no parental care. Occasionally, like a few other minnows, golden shiners can deposit their eggs in the occupied nests of pumpkinseed, largemouth bass or bowfin (the latter two can be predators of shiners). This behaviour is called egg dumping and resembles the brood parasitism of birds such as cuckoos, inasmuch as the shiner eggs will benefit from the parental care that pumpkinseed, largemouth bass, and bowfin provide to the content of their nests. In contrast to parasitism by cuckoos, however, the parent's eggs do not suffer from the presence of parasitic eggs, and may actually benefit from a dilution effect when predators attack the brood.

Behavior

Golden shiners live in large groups (shoals) that roam widely. Several laboratory studies have shown that the movements of a shoal can be determined by a minority of individuals at the front of it. For example, an individual that knows when and where food is available within a large tank can lead many other fish to the right place at the right time of day. If all fish have similar knowledge, there is still a tendency for some individuals to be found always at the front of a moving shoal, possibly because they are intrinsically hungrier and more motivated to find food. Small fish are also found more often at the front of a shoal than larger fish, again possibly because they are more motivated to find food.

Like other minnows, golden shiners are sensitive to the release of an alarm substance, or schreckstoff, contained within special skin cells. If a predator catches and bites into a minnow, the skin is broken, the substance is released, and other minnows in the vicinity can detect the substance and react to it by leaving the area. The substance can also survive intact in the feces of a predator, and minnows can thus detect the presence of a minnow-eating predator through the presence of its feces. In the laboratory, golden shiners were found to react strongly to water that contained feces from snakes that had eaten other golden shiners, but not nearly as much to water laden with feces from snakes that had eaten green swordtails, a fish that does not possess an alarm substance.

Like other fishes, golden shiners have a good daily time sense and can anticipate the arrival of food when this food is made available at the same time of the day or night. They can also do this when there is more than one mealtime a day. This anticipation is expressed as swimming and positioning towards the food source, and other naive individuals can perceive this and join the anticipating fish in the hope of sharing its food.

Golden shiners are also capable of time-place learning (associating different places with different times of day). They can be taught to feed in one part of an aquarium in the morning and a different part in the afternoon; or to feed in one part in the morning, a different part at mid-day, and back to the first part in the afternoon.

Negative effects of environmental toxicants 
Researchers have found that long-term exposure of golden shiners to methylmercury can cause disadvantageous effects in the function of the nervous, reproductive, immune, and endocrine systems as well as in behavior. For example, golden shiners exposed to methylmercury showed a decline in reproduction through the inhibition of hypothalamus, pituitary, and gonadal function. Many fish showed higher concentrations of the chemical in the brain compared to the rest of the body. Fish exposed to high amounts of mercury showed signs of delayed shoaling after exposure to predators. These fish took up to nearly three times longer to return to pre-exposure behaviors compared to other groups exposed to lower amounts of mercury.

Studies have also seen relationships between tissue damage and exposure to mercury by examining macrophage aggregates in different fish tissues. Using histological analysis, a positive correlation was seen between the total area of macrophage aggregates and total mercury concentration of muscle tissues in the spleen of both male and female golden shiners.

References 

 William F. Sigler and John W. Sigler, Fishes of the Great Basin (Reno: University of Nevada Press, 1987), pp. 188–191.

Golden shiner
Fish of Canada
Fish of the Eastern United States
Fish of the Great Lakes
Fauna of the Northeastern United States
Fauna of the Plains-Midwest (United States)
Freshwater fish of the Southeastern United States
Golden shiner
Freshwater fish of North America